Sorkh Dom-e Khushnamvand (also Romanized as Sorkh Dom-e Khūshnāmvand; also known as Khvoshnāmvand, Dom Sorkh, Dom Sorkh Lakī, and Khvosh Nāmvand) is a village in Kuhdasht-e Jonubi Rural District, in the Central District of Kuhdasht County, Lorestan Province, Iran. At the 2006 census, its population was 2,148, in 452 families.

References 

Towns and villages in Kuhdasht County